The regions of Ethiopia are administratively divided into 68 or more zones (zonə). The exact number of zones is unclear, as the names and number of zones given in documents by Ethiopia's Central Statistical Agency differ between 2005 and 2007. Various maps give different zone names and boundaries.

Zones are a 2nd level subdivision of Ethiopia, below regions and above woredas, or districts. The zones are listed below, by region.

Addis Ababa
 List of subcities

Afar Region

Awsi Rasu
Kilbet Rasu
Gabi Rasu
Fanti Rasu
Hari Rasu
Mahi Rasu (New Zone)
Argobba (special woreda)

Amhara Region

Agew Awi
East Gojjam
North Gondar
Central Gondar
West Gondar
Wag Hemra
West Gojjam
Bahir Dar (special zone)
West Gojjam
South Gondar
North Wollo
South Wollo
Oromia
North Shewa

Benishangul-Gumuz Region
Asosa
Kamashi
Metekel

Dire Dawa
 No zones

Gambela Region
 Anywaa
 Majang
 Nuer

Former zones 
Administrative Zone 1 (Gambela)
Administrative Zone 2 (Gambela)
Administrative Zone 3 (Gambela) 
Godere (woreda) (1991–1994: the only woreda in Administrative Zone 4; 1994–2001: part of Administrative Zone 2; 2007–present: part of Mezhenger Zone)

Harari Region

Amir-Nur Woreda
Abadir Woreda
Shenkor Woreda
Jin'Eala Woreda
Aboker Woreda
Hakim Woreda
Sofi Woreda
Erer Woreda
Dire-Teyara Woreda

Oromia Region

East Arsi
West Arsi
East Bale
West Bale
Borana
East Hararghe
East Shewa
East Welega
 East Guji
West Guji
Horo Guduru Welega
Illu ababora
Buno Bedele
Jimma
Kelam Welega
North Shewa
Southwest Shewa
West Haraghe
West Shewa
West Welega
Oromia Special Zone Surrounding Finfinne

Sidama Region
 No zones

Somali Region

 Sitti Zone
 Fafan Zone
 Jarar Zone
 Erer Zone
 Nogob Zone
 Dollo Zone
 Korahe Zone
 Shabelle Zone
 Afder Zone
 Liben Zone
 Dhawa Zone
 Jigjiga Special Zone
 Tog Wajale Special Zone
 Degehabur Special Zone
 Gode Special Zone
 Kebri Beyah Special Zone
 Kebri Dahar Special Zone

South West Ethiopia Peoples' Region
Bench Maji
Dawro (formerly part of North Omo Zone)
Keffa (formerly part of Keficho Shekicho Zone)
Sheka (formerly part of Keficho Shekicho Zone)
Konta (special woreda, formerly part of North Omo Zone)
West Omo

Southern Nations, Nationalities, and Peoples Region

Gamo Gofa (formerly part of North Omo Zone)
Gedeo
Gurage
Hadiya
Kembata Tembaro
Silt'e
South Omo
Konso
Wolayita (formerly part of North Omo Zone)
Alaba
Amaro (special woreda)
Basketo (special woreda, formerly part of North Omo Zone)
Burji (special woreda)
Dirashe (special woreda)
Yem (special woreda)

Former zones 
 North Omo – abolished in 2000
 Keficho Shekicho – abolished in 2007

Tigray Region

Central Tigray
East Tigray
North West Tigray
South Tigray
South East Tigray
West Tigray
Mekele (special zone)

See also
Regions of Ethiopia

Notes

References
Zones of Ethiopia

External links
Statoids

 
Subdivisions of Ethiopia
Zones
Ethiopia 2
Zones, Ethiopia